Science and Engineering South (more commonly known as the SES, and previously SES-5) is a consortium of 7 public research-intensive universities in the Southeast of England, who pool their resources and facilities to further research in the fields of science and engineering. Its members accounted for a third of all EPSRC spending in 2013, when the consortium was formed. King's College London joined the consortium in 2016, becoming the sixth member institution. By March 2017, Queen Mary University of London had joined the consortium. The University of Cambridge, one of the founder institutions, rejoined in 2019 after leaving in 2017.

SES enables a network of high-performance computers available for research and scientific calculations across all its member universities, such as the 12,000 core IRIDIS Intel Westmere supercomputer cluster.

Gallery

References

2013 establishments in England
College and university associations and consortia in the United Kingdom
Engineering education in the United Kingdom
Engineering university associations and consortia
Innovation in the United Kingdom
Organisations associated with the University of Oxford
Organizations established in 2013